Imam Mosque is related to the Qajar dynasty and is located in Semnan Province, Semnan.

Sources 

Mosques in Iran
Mosque buildings with domes
National works of Iran
Buildings and structures in Semnan Province
Qajar architecture